Rockport is the site of early settlement in Westmorland County, New Brunswick on the Maringouin Peninsula which lies between Shepody Bay and Cumberland Basin and at the northern end of Chignecto Bay. All three bodies of water are extensions of the Bay of Fundy. Other former hamlets or villages on the peninsula include Upper and Lower Rockport, Slacks Cove, Pink Rock, Hard Ledge, and Johnson's Mills. Sandstone and gypsum quarrying was the mainstay of the economy.

History

In 1763 immigrants from Swansea, Massachusetts landed at Slacks Cove and went on to establish the first Baptist church in present-day Canada A lighthouse, now-defunct, was built at Wards Point in 1890 and moved to Pecks Point in 1908.

See also
List of communities in New Brunswick

References

Further reading
 Jeffrey P. Ward, Head of the Bay: A history of the Maringouin Peninsula, Bay of Fundy, Canada, Sackville: Tantramar Heritage Trust, 2009.

Communities in Westmorland County, New Brunswick
Mining communities in New Brunswick